The Mount Vernon metropolitan area may refer to:

The Mount Vernon, Washington metropolitan area, United States
The Mount Vernon, Ohio micropolitan area, United States
The Mount Vernon, Illinois micropolitan area, United States

See also
Mount Vernon (disambiguation)